The first match of the 2015 Rock Cup was played 7 January 2015.

The winner of the tournament (Lincoln) qualified for the 2015–16 UEFA Europa League and would have entered the tournament in the first qualifying round. Since Lincoln also won the 2014–15 Gibraltar Premier Division, the place reserved for the cup winner went to the second place team in the league.

First round
The First Round draw was held 2 December 2014. All teams in this round were Gibraltar Second Division teams. Red Imps and Gibraltar Phoenix received a bye to the next round.

|}

Second round
The second round draw was held after the completion of the first round. Red Imps couldn't field a team.

|}

Quarter-finals
Matches were played 13 to 15 March.

|}

Semi-finals
The semi-final draw was held 19 March 2015. Both matches were played 25 April 2015.

|}

Final
The final was played on 30 May 2015.

|}

References

External links
Gibraltar Football Association
Season at soccerway.com

Rock Cup
Rock Cup
Rock Cup